In mathematics, a polyadic space is a topological space that is the image under a continuous function of a topological power of an Alexandroff one-point compactification of a discrete space.

History 
Polyadic spaces were first studied by S. Mrówka in 1970 as a generalisation of dyadic spaces. The theory was developed further by R. H. Marty, János Gerlits and Murray G. Bell, the latter of whom introduced the concept of the more general centred spaces.

Background 
A subset K of a topological space X is said to be compact if every open cover of K contains a finite subcover. It is said to be locally compact at a point x ∈ X if x lies in the interior of some compact subset of X. X is a locally compact space if it is locally compact at every point in the space.

A proper subset A ⊂ X is said to be dense if the closure Ā = X. A space whose set has a countable, dense subset is called a separable space.

For a non-compact, locally compact Hausdorff topological space , we define the Alexandroff one-point compactification as the topological space with the set , denoted , where , with the topology  defined as follows:
 
 , for every compact subset .

Definition 
A Hausdorff space  is polyadic if for some cardinal number , there exists a continuous surjective function , where  is the product space obtained by multiplying  with itself  times.

Examples 
Take the set of natural numbers  with the discrete topology. Choose  and define the homeomorphism  with the mapping

It follows from the definition that the space  is polyadic and compact directly from the definition of compactness, without using Heine-Borel.

Every dyadic space (a compact space which is a continuous image of a Cantor set) is a polyadic space.

Let X be a separable, compact space. If X is a metrizable space, then it is polyadic (the converse is also true).

Properties 
We define , and define . Then  The topological weight  of a polyadic space  satisfies the equality .

Let  be a polyadic space, and let .

Polyadic spaces are the smallest class of topological spaces that contain metric compact spaces and are closed under products and continuous images.

A topological space X has the Suslin property if there is no uncountable family of pairwise disjoint non-empty open subsets of X. Suppose that X has the Suslin property and X is polyadic. Then X is dyadic.

If  is a polyadic space, then .

Ramsey's theorem 
There is an analogue of Ramsey's theorem from combinatorics for polyadic spaces. For this, we describe the relationship between Boolean spaces and polyadic spaces. The Ramsey-like property for polyadic spaces as stated by Murray Bell for Boolean spaces is then as follows: every uncountable clopen collection contains an uncountable subcollection which is either linked or disjoint.

Compactness 
We can construct polyadic spaces with arbitrary compactness number. We will demonstrate this using two theorems proven by Murray Bell in 1985. Let  be a collection of sets and let  be a set. If every n-linked subset of  has a non-empty intersection, then we say that  is n-ary.

Let  be an infinite set and let  by a number such that . Let  be the collection . This topology is compact and Hausdorff.

Set . Show that . 

Theorem (Lower bound on ) Let  be such that .

From the two theorems above, it can be deduced that for  such that , we have that .

Let  be the Alexandroff one-point compactification of the discrete space , so that . It follows that  is a polyadic space. Hence  is a polyadic space with compactness number .

Generalisations 
Centred spaces, AD-compact spaces and ξ-adic spaces are generalisations of polyadic spaces.

Centred space 
Let  be a collection of sets. We say that  is centred if  for all finite subsets .

Centred spaces were introduced by Murray Bell in 2004.

AD-compact space 
Let  be a non-empty set, and consider a family of its subsets . We say that  is an adequate family if:
 

We may treat  as a topological space by considering it a subset of the Cantor cube , and in this case, we denote it .

Let  be a compact space.

AD-compact spaces were introduced by Grzegorz Plebanek. He proved that they are closed under arbitrary products and Alexandroff compactifications of disjoint unions. It follows that every polyadic space is hence an AD-compact space. The converse is not true, as there are AD-compact spaces that are not polyadic.

ξ-adic space 
Let  and  be cardinals, and let  be a Hausdorff space.

ξ-adic spaces were proposed by S. Mrówka, and the following results about them were given by János Gerlits (they also apply to polyadic spaces, as they are a special case of ξ-adic spaces).

Let  be an infinite cardinal, and let  be a topological space.

If  is a ξ-adic space, then  has the property  for each infinite cardinal . It follows from this result that no infinite ξ-adic Hausdorff space can be an extremally disconnected space.

Hyadic space 
Hyadic spaces were introduced by Eric van Douwen. They are defined as follows.

Let  be a Hausdorff space.

Polyadic spaces are hyadic.

See also 
 Dyadic space
 Eberlein compactum
 Stone space
 Stone–Čech compactification
 Supercompact space

References 

Properties of topological spaces
General topology